Ononis is a large genus of perennial herbs and shrubs from the legume family Fabaceae. The members of this genus are often called restharrows as some species grow as weeds on arable lands whose tough stems would stop the harrow. They are natively distributed in Europe.

In herbalism restharrow is used to treat bladder and kidney problems and water retention.

The active ingredients in restharrow are essential oils, flavonoid-glycosides, and tannins.

Restharrows are used as food plants by the larvae of some Lepidoptera species including the grey pug and Coleophora ononidella (which feeds exclusively on O. arvensis).

Species of Ononis 

The genus Ononis includes the following accepted species:

 Ononis adenotricha Boiss.
 Ononis alba Poir.
 Ononis alopecuroides L., foxtail restharrow
 Ononis angustissima Lam.
 Ononis antiquorum L. 
 Ononis arvensis L., field restharrow 
 Ononis avellana Pomel
 Ononis baetica Clemente
 Ononis biflora Desf.
 Ononis cossoniana Boiss. & Reut.
 Ononis cristata Mill.
 Ononis euphrasiifolia Desf.
 Ononis fruticosa L.
 Ononis inermis Pall.
 Ononis mitissima L.
 Ononis natrix L., large yellow restharrow
 Ononis ornithopodioides L.
 Ononis pubescens L.
 Ononis pusilla L.
 Ononis reclinata L., small restharrow
 Ononis repens L., common restharrow
 Ononis rotundifolia L.
 Ononis serrata Forssk.
 Ononis sicula Guss.
 Ononis speciosa Lag.
 Ononis spinosa L., spiny restharrow
 Ononis subspicata Lag.
 Ononis tridentata L.
 Ononis vaginalis Vahl
 Ononis variegata L.
 Ononis viscosa L.

References

External links 

 Medicinal uses of O. arvensis in Armenia

 
Taxa named by Carl Linnaeus
Fabaceae genera